Moseline Daniels (born 1 February 1990) is a South African cricketer who plays as a left-arm medium bowler. She played 33 One Day Internationals and 40 Twenty20 Internationals for South Africa between 2010 and 2019. In March 2018, she was one of fourteen players to be awarded a national contract by Cricket South Africa ahead of the 2018–19 season.

In November 2018, she was added to South Africa's squad for the 2018 ICC Women's World Twenty20 tournament in the West Indies. In September 2019, she was named in the F van der Merwe XI squad for the inaugural edition of the Women's T20 Super League in South Africa.

References

External links
 
 

1990 births
Living people
Cricketers from Paarl
South African women cricketers
South Africa women One Day International cricketers
South Africa women Twenty20 International cricketers
Boland women cricketers
Western Province women cricketers
Border women cricketers